The Andaman shama (Copsychus albiventris) is a species of bird in the family Muscicapidae. t is endemic to the Andaman Islands.  It was previously considered a subspecies of the white-rumped shama. Its natural habitats are subtropical or tropical dry forests and subtropical or tropical moist lowland forests.

References

Rasmussen, P.C., and J.C. Anderton. 2005. Birds of South Asia. The Ripley guide. Volume 2: attributes and status. Smithsonian Institution and Lynx Edicions, Washington D.C. and Barcelona.

Andaman shama
Birds of the Andaman Islands
Andaman shama
Andaman shama
Taxobox binomials not recognized by IUCN